The Museum of Brands in London examines the history of consumer culture from Victorian times to the present day. The museum was set up as a registered charity in 2002, and is now located at 111-117 Lancaster Rd, Notting Hill, London W11 1QT.

History
The museum showcases over 12,000 items from the Robert Opie Collection which were housed in the Museum of Advertising and Packaging at Gloucester Docks from 1984 until its closure in October 2001. The collection moved to Notting Hill in 2005. Another display of the Robert Opie Collection at Opie's Museum of Memories formed part of the now-defunct Wigan Pier Experience. The museum receives over 40,000 visitors annually.

Collection
The museum features over 12,000 original items including domestic "everyday" products, packaging, posters, toys and games.

Set out in chronological order in the form of a "Time Tunnel" the museum takes visitors on a nostalgic journey through 200 years of consumer culture, and shows how the brands around us have evolved from the naïve charm of Victorian times to the greater sophistication of today. It also reflects the change in shopping habits, the impact of transportation, media, the effects of two world wars and the gradual emancipation of women.

Throughout the year, the museum presents temporary exhibitions, talks and workshops to create debate and examine the role of brands in history and the modern world. In 2020, the Museum opened 'When Brands Take a Stand' exploring how brands engage with social issues such as gender, sexuality, wellbeing, human rights and social justice.

Museum facilities
The museum has a cafe and garden area. It is also available as a venue for receptions and parties and has a separate conference space and boardroom for meetings.

Since originally opening in Colville Mews in 2005, the museum's visitor numbers have increased fourfold; and having outgrown the premises, it reopened in September 2015 at the London Lighthouse Building in Lancaster Road, formerly owned by the Terrence Higgins Trust.

Sponsors
The museum has had help from different sponsors. Its founding sponsors include DS Smith, Diageo, Kellogg's, Cadbury, Twinings, Vodafone, McVitie's and PI Global.

In 2015, the World Branding Forum sponsored the education programme of the museum. This enabled the museum to provide quality learning experiences to students attending education sessions in the museum each year. In 2014, the museum had over 10,000 students attending sessions.

See also
 Land of Lost Content (museum)
 List of museums in London

References

External links
 Museum of Brands
 Robert Opie Collection
 Time Out article

History museums in London
Brands, Packaging and Advertising
Mass media museums in the United Kingdom
Museum of Brands, Packaging and Advertising
Museums established in 2002
Museum of Brands, Packaging and Advertising
Advertising museums
Museum of Brands, Packaging and Advertising
Tourist attractions in London
Packaging